Alexandru Jar (pen name of Alexandru Avram ; November 20, 1911 – November 10, 1988) was a Romanian poet and prose writer.

Born into a Jewish family in Iași, his parents were Iacob Avram and his wife Șura Bella; he was self-taught. He married the revolutionary Olga Bancic, and the couple began life together as members of the banned Romanian Communist Party, alternately entering and escaping prison. They went into exile in France, where in 1939 Olga gave birth to a daughter, Dolores. After the surrender of Paris during the World War II Battle of France, Jar entered the French Resistance, while his wife was captured by the Nazis and beheaded. He returned to Romania in 1943. Jar recalled his wartime experience in the poems of the 1945 collection Sânge și vis ('Blood and dream') and in the 1948 short story book Interogatoriu.

After the Coup of 1944 against Romania's pro-Axis dictator, he occupied various administrative positions in what would soon become the Romanian Writers' Union. He made his literary debut in 1930 in  magazine. Other publications that ran his work include , Șantier, Vremea, Tinerețea and Flacăra. Following two further poetry volumes that appeared in 1946 ( and ), he worked on prose. He was barred from publishing between 1956 and 1966, due to a less rigid approach he had taken that set off vehement criticism and "unmasking". He was awarded the State Prize in 1950.

Notes

1911 births
1988 deaths
Writers from Iași
Jewish Romanian writers
Romanian communists
Romanian male short story writers
Romanian short story writers
Romanian participants in the French Resistance
Jewish socialists
Jews in the French resistance
Communist members of the French Resistance
20th-century Romanian novelists
20th-century Romanian poets
Romanian male poets
Romanian male novelists